is a 2018 Japanese–Korean animated film directed by Kōbun Shizuno. A joint production between South Korea, Japan and China, it is based on the 11th book in Tatsuya Miyanishi's Tyrannosaurus series. It depicts the friendship of a lonely Tyrannosaurus rex (OKA Ceratosaurus), Tyrano, and an orphaned baby dinosaur Punon as they begin their journey in search for an earthly paradise. It made its world premiere in the Open Cinema section at the 23rd Busan International Film Festival. The scoring of the film is by the prominent Japanese musician Ryuichi Sakamoto. A sequel title My Tyrano II: Easter, Garden release on april 26, 2023 in south Koran & release on April 25, 2025 in japan Tokyo

Cast 
 Shin-ichiro Miki as Tyrano
 Kaori Ishihara as Punon
 Aoi Yūki as Top
 Toshiyuki Morikawa as Ructo
 Nobuyuki Hiyama as Ruichi

References

External links  
 
 

2018 films
2018 anime films
Animated films about dinosaurs
Films directed by Kobun Shizuno
2010s Japanese-language films
South Korean animated films
Films postponed due to the COVID-19 pandemic
Anime postponed due to the COVID-19 pandemic
Tezuka Productions
2010s Japanese films
2010s South Korean films